Tomáš Pöpperle (born October 10, 1984) is a Czech professional ice hockey goaltender currently playing for the Fischtown Pinguins in Deutsche Eishockey Liga (DEL). He was originally selected by the Columbus Blue Jackets, 131st overall, in the 2005 NHL Entry Draft, and played 2 games for them during the 2006–07 season. The rest of his career, which started in 2003, has been spent in the DEL and Czech Extraliga.

Playing career
Pöpperle played two games for the Columbus Blue Jackets during the 2006–07 season. However, he spent most of that year playing with the Blue Jackets American Hockey League affiliate the Syracuse Crunch. After a second season with the Crunch, Pöpperle returned to Europe to play for HC Sparta Praha. He signed with newly formed Kontinental Hockey League team HC Lev Praha in 2012.

In 2014, he signed with another newly formed team, HC Sochi, also in the KHL. He rejoined HC Sparta Praha for the 2015–16 season.

Career statistics

Regular season and playoffs

International

Transactions
 July 30, 2005 - Drafted by the Columbus Blue Jackets in the 5th round, 131st overall.

References

External links

1984 births
Living people
Columbus Blue Jackets draft picks
Columbus Blue Jackets players
Czech ice hockey goaltenders
Eisbären Berlin players
Fischtown Pinguins players
HC Lev Praha players
HC Plzeň players
HC Sochi players
HC Sparta Praha players
People from Broumov
Syracuse Crunch players
Sportspeople from the Hradec Králové Region
Czech people of German descent
Czech expatriate ice hockey players in Germany
Czech expatriate ice hockey players in the United States
Czech expatriate ice hockey players in Russia